U-93 may refer to one of the following German submarines:

 , a Type U 93 submarine launched in 1916 and that served in the First World War until it went missing after 15 January 1918
 During the First World War, Germany also had these submarines with similar names:
 , a Type UB III submarine launched in 1918 and surrendered on 21 November 1918; broken up at Rochester in 1922
 , a Type UC III submarine launched in 1918 and surrendered on 26 November 1918; broken up at La Spezia in August 1919
 , a Type VIIC submarine that served in the Second World War until sunk on 15 January 1942

Submarines of Germany